Orte railway station serves the town and comune of Orte, in the region of Lazio, central Italy. Opened in 1865, it forms part of the Florence–Rome railway and the Ancona–Orte railway.

The station is currently managed by Rete Ferroviaria Italiana (RFI).  However, the commercial area of the passenger building is managed by Centostazioni.  Train services are operated by Trenitalia.  Each of these companies is a subsidiary of Ferrovie dello Stato (FS), Italy's state-owned rail company.

Location
Orte railway station is situated in Piazza Giovanni XXIII in the locality of Orte Scalo, approximately two kilometres southeast of the town centre.

History
The station was opened on 1 April 1865, upon the inauguration of the Rome–Orte section of the Rome–Ancona railway.  On 4 January 1866, the station ceased to be a terminus, when the line was extended further southeast, as far as Foligno.

Between 1928 and 1961, Orte was the junction for a branch line to Civitavecchia upon which some filming of Von Ryan's Express took place.  From then until 1994, that line was operated only between Capranica and Orte.  The line is currently disused, but in September 2010 a contract was let for its reconstruction.

Features
The single storey passenger building is made of brick with a colonnade facing the Piazza.  It houses a bar, newsstand, ticket office, waiting room and toilets.  The station features seven tracks for passenger service, including five through tracks and two terminating tracks.  There is also a large goods yard used for the overnight storage of goods trains.

Passenger and train movements

Passenger movements
The station has about 3.0 million passenger movements each year.

Long distance and regional services
Some InterCity and Eurostar City trains passing through the station stop there. Frequent regional trains link Orte with nearby destinations, including Rome, Florence, Fiumicino Airport, Foligno, Terontola, Terni, Perugia and Viterbo.

Ferrovie regionali del Lazio services
The station is also the terminus of the Ferrovie regionali del Lazio FR1 commuter service from Fiumicino Airport.

See also

History of rail transport in Italy
List of railway stations in Lazio
Rail transport in Italy
Railway stations in Italy

References

External links

Description and pictures of Orte railway station 

Province of Viterbo
Railway stations in Lazio
Railway stations opened in 1865